Premaydena is a rural locality in the local government area of Tasman in the South-east region of Tasmania. The 2016 census has a population of 99 for the state suburb of Premaydena.

History
Premaydena was gazetted as a locality in 1967.

It was the site of a convict settlement. It was once known as Impression Bay.

A digital scan of a painting of Impression Bay station at Premaydena, dated approximately 1845, is freely available online to the public.

Geography
The shore of Norfolk Bay forms the northern boundary.

Road infrastructure
The B37 route (Nubeena Road) enters from the north-east and runs through to the south, where it exits. Route C341 (Saltwater River Road) starts at an intersection with B37 in the north and runs north-west until it exits.

References

Towns in Tasmania
Localities of Tasman Council